James Gregory (7 November 1941 – 2003) was the censor officer and prison guard of Nelson Mandela for many years of his captivity. He later wrote the book Goodbye Bafana: Nelson Mandela, My Prisoner, My Friend, on which the 2007 film Goodbye Bafana was based. The book, and later the film, are based on the idea that Gregory and Mandela had developed a friendship despite being prison guard and prisoner, respectively.

Mandela's view of Gregory 
In his autobiography, Long Walk to Freedom, Mandela briefly mentions Gregory on two occasions. The first was during his imprisonment in Pollsmoor Prison:
 

The second occasion that Mandela mentions Gregory in his autobiography is on the day of his release in 1990 from prison:

The Making Of video for the film Goodbye Bafana contains an interview with Nelson Mandela where he speaks of James Gregory as follows:

Criticism
Gregory's claims were disputed by one of Mandela's biographers, Anthony Sampson. Sampson's biography said that Gregory was pretending to be Mandela's friend in prison, so that he could make money. According to Sampson, the close relationship depicted in Gregory's book, Goodbye Bafana, was a fabrication, and in reality Gregory rarely spoke to Mandela. Gregory censored the letters sent to the future president and thus discovered the details of Mandela's personal life, which he sold in Goodbye Bafana.

Sampson said that Mandela considered suing Gregory, but refrained from doing so when the Prison Department distanced itself from Gregory's book. Sampson also said that other warders had told him in interviews that they suspected Gregory of spying for the government. 

Mandela later invited Gregory to his inauguration as President, apparently having forgiven him as he had the former president P.W. Botha, and the prosecutor Dr. Percy Yutar who had tried to get him executed in the Rivonia Trial.

See also
 Goodbye Bafana, the film

References

External links
 The Independent, 11 February 1994: I was Nelson's Friend, And Jailer: James Gregory tells his story to Benjamin Pogrund Retrieved 2012-07-10
 SouthAfrica.info, 3 June 2011: The story of Mandela's warders Retrieved 2012-07-10
 The Nelson Mandela Foundation: Nelson Mandela's Warders Retrieved 2012-07-10

1941 births
2003 deaths
White South African people
South African writers
People from the Western Cape
South African prison officers